Joseph Ernest Kitchen (Joe Kitchen)(20 June 1890 – 23 November 1974) was an English footballer who played as a striker. Born in Brigg, Lincolnshire he played for Gainsborough Trinity, Sheffield United and Hull City. He was known as a prolific goal scorer.

Club career
Kitchen came to prominence whilst playing for Division Two side Gainsborough Trinity. Though clubs were interested in securing his services, Kitchen signed for Sheffield United in 1909 as part of a £600 deal that also took fellow forward Gee Gee Brown to Bramall Lane. Making his United début aged only 17, Kitchen became a mainstay of the side, scoring regularly throughout his time with the Blades. He scored several goals for Sheffield during their FA Cup campaign of 1915, scoring the third and final Sheffield goal in the final a few minutes from the final whistle.  The goal was a solo effort, he picked the ball up just over the centre line, beat two defenders and then slipped past the Chelsea keeper, who had come out to challenge Kitchen, before placing the ball in the empty net.

Kitchen remained at United for the duration of World War I and into the resumption of league football in 1919. He was transferred to Rotherham County for £650 in 1920 after a disagreement over his contract but failed to settle and returned to Bramall Lane within a matter of months after United agreed to repay the fee.  Falling out of favour by this time Kitchen finally moved on to Hull City the following season for a much reduced fee of £250 from where he drifted through a number of clubs including two further spells back at Gainsborough.

Honours
Sheffield United
FA Cup: 1914–15

References

1890 births
1974 deaths
People from Brigg
English footballers
Association football forwards
Brigg Town F.C. players
Gainsborough Trinity F.C. players
Sheffield United F.C. players
Rotherham County F.C. players
Hull City A.F.C. players
Scunthorpe United F.C. players
Shirebrook Miners Welfare F.C. players
Barton Town F.C. (1880) players
English Football League players
FA Cup Final players